Four in a Bed is a British reality television game show, a spin-off of a similar now defunct primetime equivalent known as Three in a Bed. The show involves four sets of B&B owners competing to have their B&B crowned the best value for money. The sixth series has been broadcast on Channel 4 since 10 March 2014, following the broadcaster's decision to renew the show for another series. It currently airs at 5.00pm weekdays.

The programme is voiced over by the English actor, impressionist & musician Duncan Wisbey

Format 
A group of four sets of B&B owners come together to assess the quality of each other's establishments, but not their own. At every visit to one of the four B&B's, the owner/s of the establishment will greet the others and will then show them to their room, where its cost and information on breakfast will usually be given to them. Once the owner/s of the establishment have left the room, the fellow guest B&B owners, each in their individual rooms, will give their first impressions. Once everyone is settled in, the guests are taken to an activity devised by the owner/s. The owner/s will hope to show their nature as well as the nature of the B&B somewhere within this activity. Following the activity, the guests go back to their rooms and soon join the hosting B&B owner/s for an evening meal. This sometimes takes place at the B&B, however it can take place elsewhere upon recommendation by the owner/s. This provides an ample opportunity for the other B&B owners to get to know each other and particularly the hosting B&B owner/s better, asking questions such as how they got into the business for example. Then, the guests will go back to their rooms and finish the day sharing their thoughts on both the B&B and the other guests.

The next morning, the guests will each usually offer feedback on how they slept, and the host/s will prepare breakfast for the others. Once breakfast has been served and consumed, the guests will fill out an anonymous feedback form where they can summarize all of their criticisms, both positive and negative, into one, by both scoring a series of relevant categories out of ten and writing any comments they wish about their stay, including if they would like to stay again. They will then place in an envelope how much money they think their stay was worth in relation to the asking price of their room. In order to resolve any differences in price between the different rooms and B&B's, the host's final score is presented as a percentage. For example, if one set of owners paid £60 for a room that normally sells for £80, thereby only paying 75%, and the other set paid £110 for a stay that normally commands £100, thereby paying 110%, the host's final score would be 94%. This money is sealed and the host alongside the other owners cannot see its contents until all of the owners have had their B&B's visited and critiqued. However, the owner/s can look at the anonymous feedback forms and this may influence what they say or do in the coming visits to B&B's of the other B&B owners.

Once everyone has had their own B&B inspected by the others, the four sets of B&B owners gather around a table to open the sealed envelopes from every visit, ask questions about their anonymous feedback forms, and finally decipher the winner, who will be the B&B owner/s with the highest percentage of their costs paid. The winning B&B owner gets a plaque as that week's best value for money B&B. This process is presented on air throughout one week, or five thirty-minute episodes. Thereafter, new sets of B&B owners take part and the process is repeated again and again according to the number of episodes in the series.

Episodes summary 
Key:
In the visits section, where an N/A is shown, this denotes to when a B&B owner could not take part in the usual process as it was their own B&B.
 The payment was paid in full.
 The payment received was more than that of the asking price of the room.
 The payment received was less than that of the asking price of the room.

Episodes 1-5

B&B owners

Visits

Edenmore Guest House 
Activity: Curling
Restaurant Location: Edenmore Guest House

Grassington Lodge 
Activity: Cake making
Restaurant Location: A local hotel

Manor Farm 
Activity: Crocodile feeding
Restaurant Location: Manor Farm

George & Dragon 
Activity: Paranormal investigation
Restaurant Location: George & Dragon

References 

2014 British television seasons